Bulbophyllum wangkaense is a species of orchid in the genus Bulbophyllum.

Found only in Thailand at elevations around 200 to 300 meters as a miniature to small sized, hot growing epiphyte with [4 cm] between each conical pseudobulb carrying a single, elliptic, minutely retuse apically leaf that blooms on an erect to arching 2 to 4" [5 to 10 cm] long, many flowered inflorescence that is sheathed in the lower half.'''

References

The Bulbophyllum-Checklist
The Internet Orchid Species Photo Encyclopedia

wangkaense